Marcin Antoni Kubiak is a Polish astrophysicist, who obtained his professorship title on 25 April 1994. Member of Committee of Astronomy of the Polish Academy of Sciences, a member of the Optical Gravitational Lensing Experiment (OGLE), co-discoverer (together with OGLE team) of many extrasolar planetary systems (e.g. OGLE-2006-BLG-109L). Author of widely used academic book for astronomy students "Stars and interstellar matter" (:pl:Gwiazdy i materia międzygwiazdowa). Head of the Warsaw University Observatory , University of Warsaw during 1986–2008. Editor of quarterly scientific journal Acta Astronomica and a chairman of Copernicus Foundation for Polish Astronomy.

He is a co-discoverer of 471143 Dziewanna, a trans-Neptunian object and possibly a dwarf planet.

See also

References

External links 
 List of publications in Astrophysics Data System

20th-century Polish astronomers
Academic staff of the University of Warsaw
Living people
Year of birth missing (living people)
21st-century Polish astronomers